Jesse Pinto is an Australian-born East Timorese footballer who last played for Australian club Hellenic Athletic.

Biography
Jesse grew up in Western Sydney attending Hebersham Primary School and Hills Sports High School. On 9 January 2009 he made his senior debut for the Jets against Adelaide United. He was used as a substitute in the 66th minute but was controversially taken off in the 82nd minute.

International career
In 2008 Pinto represented Australia at U-19 Schoolboy level where he participated in international friendlies in the United Kingdom.

Pinto began his international career as a Timor-Leste U-23 that in preparing for the Southeast Asian Games in November 2011. Pinto made his debut as a national team U-23 match against Indonesia U-23 on 25 October 2011, which ended in defeat 0–5.

He made his debut for the Timor-Leste on 7 October 2012 in a match against Myanmar.

References

External links
 Newcastle Jets profile
 Blacktown City stats
 Pinto at ligaindonesia.co.id
 Pinto at affsuzukicup.com
 
 

1990 births
Living people
Soccer players from Sydney
Australian people of East Timorese descent
A-League Men players
Blacktown City FC players
Newcastle Jets FC players
East Timorese footballers
East Timorese expatriate footballers
Association football midfielders
Expatriate footballers in Myanmar
Yadanarbon F.C. players
Expatriate footballers in Indonesia
Mitra Kukar players
Liga 1 (Indonesia) players
Timor-Leste international footballers